Adrian Lewis Clifton (born 12 December 1988) is an English born Montserratian footballer who plays as a forward for National League club Maidenhead United and the Montserrat national team.

Club career

Isthmian League 
Clifton started his career in the youth ranks of Arsenal, developing with the club from the ages of 11 to 15, followed by spells with Norwich City and West Ham United. He served three prison sentences as a youngster before heading into non-league football. During his last prison sentence he featured on Ian Wright's TV show Football Behind Bars.

The midfielder joined Isthmian League Division One North side Romford ahead of the 2011–12 season, having impressed in a pre-season trial. After a short stint playing in the non-pyramid TTFF League for Yalova, Clifton returned and scored on his debut in the FA Cup. Unable to reproduce the form he displayed in the summer, he left the club at the end of the season.

Clifton joined Waltham Forest in August 2012, and took the captain's armband and while featuring regularly for the first team. In April 2013, Clifton left Waltham Forest to join East Thurrock United. Having declined several offers from teams in the Isthmian Division One North, he finally left in order to climb the ranks to the Isthmian Premier Division. His final game for Forest saw him score a hat-trick against Ilford.

National League 
Clifton featured nine times for East Thurrock United in the final month of the season, recording seven wins and two draws. However, in May 2015 he was snapped up by National League South side Maidenhead United, who had been previously watching the midfielder.

He won the Manager's Player of the Season award in 2013/14, and was nicknamed 'Yaya' after comparisons with Yaya Touré. At the end of his second season with the Magpies, he helped the club lift their first Berks & Bucks Senior Cup in four years, scoring in the 4–0 final win over Aylesbury United. After two seasons at York Road, Clifton became Lee Bradbury's first signing at Havant & Waterlooville, joining in the summer of 2015 on a two-year contract.

After suffering an injury that ruled him out for four months, Clifton joined Isthmian League Premier Division side Staines Town on a one-month loan in February 2016. He made four appearances in his time with the club before returning to Havant. He joined Staines permanently for the 2016–17 season.

On 22 July 2017, Maidenhead United's official Twitter account announced that Clifton had once again signed for them. Clifton scored a brace against Bromley on 24 October 2017, though many sources incorrectly stated that he scored a hat-trick. At the end of the 2018–19 season, Clifton won all five awards at the Magpies' end of season awards, winning the Player of the Season awards from each of the players, manager and supporters, the Golden Boot award with 15 goals in all competitions, and the Goal of the Season award.

On 3 May 2019, it was announced that Clifton would join Bromley for the 2019–20 season. 

On 18 September 2020, Clifton signed for Dagenham & Redbridge. He was released by Dagenham along with five others in June 2021 following the expiration of his contract.

On 3 September 2021, Clifton signed for Boreham Wood. After coming on as a substitute to score in Wood’s FA Cup second round tie with St Albans City, Clifton then repeated the trick against AFC Wimbledon in round three to set up a clash with Championship high-flyers AFC Bournemouth. Clifton came on as a late substitute as Boreham Wood exited the competition in front of a 38,836 crowd at Goodison Park in the fifth round.

On 27 June 2022, Maidenhead United announced that Clifton had re-joined the club for a third spell. On 17 February 2023, he joined Hampton & Richmond Borough on loan.

International career 
Clifton made his international debut for Montserrat on 31 March 2015, featuring in a 2–2 draw with Curaçao during 2018 World Cup qualification.

Personal life 
Clifton works as a gas engineer.

Career statistics

Club

International

International goals
Scores and results list Montserrat's goal tally first.

Honours 
Maidenhead United
Berks & Bucks Senior Cup: 2014/15, 2016/17 (final played in 2017/18 pre-season)

References 

1988 births
Living people
Footballers from the London Borough of Hackney
Montserratian footballers
Montserrat international footballers
English footballers
English people of Montserratian descent
Romford F.C. players
Waltham Forest F.C. players
East Thurrock United F.C. players
Maidenhead United F.C. players
Havant & Waterlooville F.C. players
Staines Town F.C. players
Bromley F.C. players
Dagenham & Redbridge F.C. players
Boreham Wood F.C. players
Hampton & Richmond Borough F.C. players
National League (English football) players
Isthmian League players
Association football forwards
Black British sportspeople